The Kad pogledaš me preko ramena Tour is the worldwide concert tour by Serbian singer Zdravko Čolić, in support of his thirteenth studio album, Kad pogledas me preko ramena. It began on February 14, 2010, in Split, Croatia at the Spaladium Arena, but official start on July 31, 2010, in Sarajevo, Bosnia and Hercegovina at the stadium Kosevo and is continuing throughout Canada and Europe. It will finish on December 31, 2013.
The tour also includes some festival concerts.

Shows

References

External links
Zdravko Čolić Official Website

2010 concert tours
2011 concert tours
2012 concert tours
2013 concert tours